Augsburg-Oberhausen station is a station in the northwest of the central Augsburg in the suburb of Oberhausen in the German state of Bavaria. It is the second most important station in the city. It is classified by Deutsche Bahn as a category 4 station. The current station building was built south of the old Oberhauser station in 1931/32, in the New Objectivity style. There is a large tram and bus stop in front of the station building, the exterior of which has recently been renovated.

Infrastructure 

Augsburg-Oberhausen is a through station with seven tracks on four platforms. The trains can be reached by a tunnel under the tracks, which runs from the ground floor of the station building. This is not accessible for the disabled. The station building has a ticket machine, a kiosk and a bar.

Services

The Augsburg-Oberhausen station is served by all Regional-Express and Regionalbahn services leaving Augsburg Hauptbahnhof to the north and the west. Thus it serves as a transfer station from the route from Ulm towards Donauwörth and vice versa. The services of Bayerische Regiobahn to or from Schongau normally also begin or end in Augsburg-Oberhausen. Long-distance services do not stop at the station.

Public transport at Oberhausen station consists of tram line 2 (Augsburg-West–Haunstetten-Nord), city bus route 35 (Bergstraße–Pfersee-Süd), night bus route 91 (Königsplatz–Stadtbergen) and several regional bus lines. As a result, it also plays a major role as a hub for public transport and is well used at peak times. The tram and bus stops are located directly outside the station.

Freight

In addition to its important role for passengers, the  station is also significant for freight: containers are transhipped from rail to road on the sidings.  A new unloading yard in the multi-modal terminal is expected from 2012/2013 to relieve the Oberhausen container terminal, which is at the centre of the Augsburg–Gersthofen–Neusäß triangle.

Future

As part of the establishment of the Augsburg S-Bahn the station is gaining an increasing importance: up to three lines (to Dinkelscherben, Donauwörth and Fischach) will stop here in the future and so strengthen its role as a key interchange point for the districts of Oberhausen and Kriegshaber.

In recent years there have been several remodelling and renovation projects, especially of the station forecourt and the exterior facade. However, the construction of a reversing track, which is required for this project, has not been carried out. This project—and the introduction of the Augsburg S-Bahn—is still at the planning stage.

Notes

Oberhausen
Railway stations in Germany opened in 1932